Kazbar (also known as Karzbar, Karzabar, Karzebar, Karzebū, Kazabar, and Kazzebar) is a village in Zanjanrud-e Pain Rural District, Zanjanrud District, Zanjan County, Zanjan Province, Iran. At the 2006 census, its population was 662, in 172 families.

References 

Populated places in Zanjan County